Sara Nicole Andersen (born November 2, 1992, in Tehran) is a Norwegian-Iranian model and beauty pageant titleholder.

Andersen started modeling at age 13, and was crowned Miss Universe Norway 2012. She competed in the 2012 Miss Universe pageant, placing at the 22nd place out of 88. Sara Nicole Anderson moved from to Norway (Notodden) in 2000 at age 8 from Turkey. 

In 2012-2014 she dated Jaysuma 'Jays' Saidy, a sprinter of Gambian descent. As of 2019 she was living with Lars Ove Løseth, whom she met in 2015 and with whom she has a son (born 2016).

References

External links
Official Miss Universe Norway website

1992 births
Living people
Models from Oslo
Iranian emigrants to Norway
Miss Universe 2012 contestants
Norwegian beauty pageant winners
Norwegian female models